The International Journal of Digital Earth is an academic journal about Digital Earth published by Taylor & Francis on behalf of the International Society for Digital Earth.
It focus on concepts such as "Earth observation, geographic information systems and [geographic information] science".
Its editor-in-chief is Guo Huadong;
its 2018 impact factor is 3.985.

References

Geographic information systems
Geography journals
Remote sensing journals
Taylor & Francis academic journals
Academic journals associated with international learned and professional societies